The classical electron radius is a combination of fundamental physical quantities that define a length scale for problems involving an electron interacting with electromagnetic radiation. It links the classical electrostatic self-interaction energy of a homogeneous charge distribution to the electron's relativistic mass–energy.  According to modern understanding, the electron is a point particle with a point charge and no spatial extent.  Nevertheless, it is useful to define a length that characterizes electron interactions in atomic-scale problems.  The classical electron radius is given as

This numerical value is several times larger than the radius of the proton.

In cgs units, the permittivity factor and  do not enter, but the classical electron radius has the same value.

The classical electron radius is sometimes known as the Lorentz radius or the Thomson scattering length.  It is one of a trio of related scales of length, the other two being the Bohr radius  and the reduced Compton wavelength of the electron .   Any one of these three length scales can be written in terms of any other using the fine-structure constant :

Derivation
The classical electron radius length scale can be motivated by considering the energy necessary to assemble an amount of charge  into a sphere of a given radius .  The electrostatic potential at a distance  from a charge  is
.

To bring an additional amount of charge  from infinity necessitates putting energy into the system,  by an amount 
.   

If the sphere is assumed to have constant charge density, then 

Doing the integration for  starting at zero up to a final radius  leads to the expression for the total energy, necessary to assemble total charge  into a uniform sphere of radius :
.  

This is called the electrostatic self-energy of the object. The charge  is now interpreted as the electron charge, and the energy  is set equal to the relativistic mass–energy of the electron, and the numerical factor 3/5 is ignored as being specific to the special case of a uniform charge density. The radius  is then defined to be the classical electron radius, and one arrives at the expression given above.

Note that this derivation does not say that  is the actual radius of an electron.   It only establishes a dimensional link between electrostatic self energy and the mass–energy scale of the electron.

Discussion
The electron radius occurs in the classical limit of modern theories as well, such as non-relativistic Thomson scattering and the relativistic Klein–Nishina formula.  Also,  is roughly the length scale at which renormalization becomes important in quantum electrodynamics.  That is, at short-enough distances, quantum fluctuations within the vacuum of space surrounding an electron begin to have calculable effects that have measurable consequences in atomic and particle physics.

Based on the assumption of a simple mechanical model, attempts to model the electron as a non-point particle have been described by some as ill-conceived and counter-pedagogic.

See also 
 Electromagnetic mass

References

Further reading
 Arthur N. Cox, Ed. "Allen's Astrophysical Quantities", 4th Ed, Springer, 1999.

External links 
 Length Scales in Physics: the Classical Electron Radius

Physical constants
Atomic physics
Electron